Vincent L.J. Deng's cultural practices encompass arts, new media and film.

Career
As an arts coordinator, Deng was the exclusive assistant of the I Want To Believe show (2008) of artist Cai Guoqiang, organized by the Solomon R. Guggenheim Museum. As a media supporter he joined the Beijing Olympics, and as assistant president of Unique group and director of Hong Kong Vince Development Co., Ltd., he hosted and participated in Expo Shanghai (2010), coordinating the Turkey, Slovenia, Serbia and Seychelles and European Joint Pavilions.

As an independent curator, he was executive secretary-general of 798 International Art Festival (2009) and curator of Sanlitun's Green Christmas Exhibition. He worked with Tsinghua University Art School to bring new ideas and modern art to China. Deng curated the Chongqing art and home market (2011). He was guest associate professor of Sichuan Fine Arts Institute. As of 2011 he was based in Hong Kong and Chongqing. He was curator of the 2013 Murikami Shanghai Exhibition and Project Director of the 2013 Kengo Kuma Exhibition China.

Deng was a committee member of Chaine des Rotisseurs, chairman of the Arts Working Group of the British Chambers of Commerce, and Hong Kong Chamber of Commerce.

Essays

Expo 2010 Shanghai
 Turkish Pavilion of Expo 2010, Shanghai, China
China Aviation Pavilion of Expo 2010, Shanghai, China
Slovenia Pavilion of Expo 2010, Shanghai, China
Serbia Pavilion of Expo 2010, Shanghai, China
European Joint Pavilion of Expo 2010, Shanghai, China
Seychelles Pavilion of Expo 2010, Shanghai, China

Museum
Project Plan of Shanghai "movie city", 2009, Shanghai,China
China Umbrella Museum, 2009, Hangzhou, China
Turpan Museum, 2008, Xinjiang, China
Wedding Theme Park, 2009, Zhuhai, China
Dalang Planning Exhibition Hall, 2009, Shenzhen, China
Museum of Chinese Pipe, 2008, Langfang, China

Arts
 798 International Art Festival, 2009, Beijing,China
Sanlitun Green Christmas Exhibition, 2009, Beijing, China
 798 Turpan Non-heritage Culture week, 2009, Beijing,China
 798 Beijing Olympics Promotion Week [Ancient Sports and Modern], 2008, Beijing, China
Hundred Dutch Architecture Exhibition, 2009, CAFA Art Museum, Beijing, China
798 Yimo Art Exhibition, 2009, Beijing, China
Longfor Art & Home Market, 2011, Chongqing, China
Break Arts Exhibition, 2011, Chongqing, China
Master Print of Pablo Picasso, 2012, Chongqing, China

Media and interviews
 "The new step of expo.", Chongqing Morning Newspaper, 25 March 2010, Chongqing, China
 "The question of curator", Artnow Media, 13 October 2010, Beijing, China
 "The young artist brings new market", CHINAADC media, 16 October 2010, Beijing, China

Art review
 Feedback of Luo Zhongli, Artist, Luo Zhongli
 Who can read Cai Guo-Qiang, Beijing

References

External links
Vincent L.J. DENG's Blog
Vincent L.J. DENG's Weibo

Chinese contemporary artists
Living people
21st-century Chinese educators
21st-century Chinese artists
Chinese educators
Year of birth missing (living people)